Eupithecia avara is a moth in the family Geometridae. It is found in China.

References

Moths described in 1984
avara
Moths of Asia